The EME Temple or "Dakshinamurthy Temple" is a temple dedicated to Lord Shiva, built in 1966 and run by Indian Army authorities in the city of Vadodara, in the state of Gujarat, Western India. It is unique in its concept and design and its geodesic structure, covered with aluminium sheets, is well regarded by archaeologists. It was built by the Indian Army Corps of EME. Credit for the  idea and unique concept of this temple goes to माधव आचवल , a famous marathi writer and architect. This temple is a major attraction for both tourist and devotees and is one of its kind in the world.

History and Significance

The former Christian commandant – Brig A.F. Eugene, of the EME School, was the mastermind behind the EME Temple.

The Temple is a symbol of secularism in the country as it displays various features of major religions of India.

 The Kalasha on the top of the dome represents Hinduism.
 The dome is built according to Islamic architecture.
 The tower, beneath which the idol of Lord Dakshinamurthy is situated, represents Christianity.
 The golden tower top is in accordance with Buddhist principles.
 The Entrance of the temple depicts Jain religious traditions.
 The fire in the temple represents Zoroastrianism.

The idol of the main deity faces South - metaphorically representing Lord Dakshinamurthy imparting his teachings to the world. Other notable features include an idol of Lord Ganesha, brought from Mahabalipuram and an arch behind Lord Shiva's idol, made of pure silver and engraved with the sacred mantra Om Namah Shivaya. The temple is surrounded by statues of over a hundred deities, dating back to 6th century, imitating the Amarnath Temple, one of the most sacred shrines of Lord Shiva.

The temple is open from 6:30 AM to 8:30 PM for tourists and devotees. The lush green landscape inside temple is very beautiful and well maintained by Indian Army.

References

Tourist attractions in Vadodara
Hindu temples in Gujarat
Shiva temples in India
Buildings and structures in Vadodara
1966 establishments in Gujarat
Religious buildings and structures completed in 1966